The Amarillo Civic Center is a multi-purpose convention center in Amarillo, Texas.  It consists of multiple facilities including:

 A 2,848-seat auditorium with 2,324 permanent seats used for concerts, Broadway shows and other events.
 The Cal Farley Coliseum, a 4,987-seat multi-purpose arena serving as home to the Amarillo Wranglers of the North American Hockey League and the Amarillo Venom of Champions Indoor Football. The arena, which has 4,879 permanent seats, is also used for concerts, banquets, conventions, ice shows, wrestling and trade shows (the arena features  of floor space).  The arena measures 38' 10 from floor to rafters, 50'10 from floor to ceiling.
 A  grand plaza, designed as a tribute to Texas and seating up to 1,100 for smaller concerts, banquets, and other special events.  It contains a Texas-accented floor, skylight ceiling, and fountains and planters.
 Three meeting rooms—the Heritage, Hospitality, and Regency rooms.

There is a memorial statue of the Space Shuttle commander Rick Husband, one of the city's most famous sons, in front of the building.

References

External links
 Official website

Indoor ice hockey venues in the United States
Convention centers in Texas
Concert halls in Texas
Sports in Amarillo, Texas
Buildings and structures in Amarillo, Texas
Tourist attractions in Amarillo, Texas
Indoor arenas in Texas
Indoor soccer venues in the United States